Pat Simon Afif (born March 20, 1983) is a former gridiron football offensive tackle. He was signed by the Spokane Shock as a street free agent in 2006. He played college football at Washington State. Afif was also a member of the San Jose SaberCats, Arizona Rattlers, Toronto Argonauts, Florida Tuskers, New York Sentinels, Orlando Predators, Edmonton Eskimos, Philadelphia Soul, Sacramento Mountain Lions and New Orleans VooDoo.

Professional career

Florida Tuksers
Afif was signed by the Florida Tuskers of the United Football League on September 9, 2009.

References

1983 births
Living people
American football offensive tackles
Canadian football offensive linemen
Players of American football from Los Angeles
Washington State Cougars football players
Spokane Shock players
San Jose SaberCats players
Arizona Rattlers players
Toronto Argonauts players
Florida Tuskers players
New York Sentinels players
Orlando Predators players
Edmonton Elks players
Philadelphia Soul players
Sacramento Mountain Lions players
New Orleans VooDoo players
Players of Canadian football from Los Angeles